Front of Islamic Revolution Stability (also translated Persevering Front, Endurance Front and Steadfast Front) is an Iranian principlist political group described as "extreme end of the fundamentalist camp" and "Iran’s most right-wing party". It was established as an electoral list for the 2012 legislative election. The Front is partly made up of former ministers of Mahmoud Ahmadinejad and Mohammad-Taqi Mesbah-Yazdi is said to be the "spiritual leader" behind the group.

In 2013, the Front supported Saeed Jalili for president after Kamran Bagheri Lankarani's withdrawal, and released electoral list for local elections in several cities, with a landslide victory in Mashhad City Council.

The front declares that it stands against both “sedition” (2009 Iranian presidential election protests) and the “deviant current”. Rajanews website is its online mouthpiece.

Election results

President

Parliament

City councils

Members

Party leaders

Current officeholders 

Parliament members
 Ahmad Salek (Isfahan)
 Mohammad Esmaeil Saeidi (Tabriz)
 Mojtaba Zonnour (Qom)
 Ahmad Amirabadi (Qom)
 Javad Karimi-Ghodousi (Mashhad)
 Amir-Hossein Ghazizadeh Hashemi (Mashhad)
 Nasrollah Pejmanfar (Mashhad)
 Ehsan Ghazizadeh Hashemi (Fariman)
 Hossein Naghavi-Hosseini (Varamin)
 Mohammad-Mehdi Zahedi (Kerman)
 Mohammad-Javad Abtahi (Khomeinishahr)
 Hossein-Ali Haji-Deligani (Shahin Shahr)
 Alireza Salimi (Mahallat)

Notes and references 

2011 establishments in Iran
Principlist political groups in Iran
Political parties established in 2011
Far-right political parties
Electoral lists for Iranian legislative election, 2012
Right-wing populist parties